Robin Dutt (born 24 January 1965) is a German football coach, executive and former player.

Early life
Dutt was born and brought up in Germany, the son of a German mother and Indian Bengali father from Kolkata. His father moved to Germany in the late 1950s.

Playing career
As a player, Dutt played amateur football in the fifth, sixth, and seventh divisions in Germany.

Coaching and executive career

Early career
Dutt's started coaching TSG Leonberg towards the end of his career as a player. He was the coach of TSG Leonberg until 1999. The club gained promotion to the next higher division in his final year as a manager at the club. He then joined TSF Ditzingen, as their second team coach and then promoted as the first team coach.

Stuttgarter Kickers
Dutt's success brought him into the limelight locally and he then went on to join former Bundesliga side Stuttgarter Kickers as their second team coach in summer 2002. The Kickers gave Dutt a chance as their first team coach on 28 October 2003 and he would guide the club well with a young team in the Regionalliga (third division) in difficult times as the club did not have the necessary funds. The highlight came in the 2006–07 season when the Kickers beat Bundesliga side Hamburger SV 4–3 in extra time in the DFB-Pokal.

SC Freiburg
Dutt decided to take up the job at 2. Bundesliga club SC Freiburg in summer 2007. It was the end of an era as previous coach Volker Finke had coached Freiburg for 16 years, a record in German professional football. The going initially was not easy for Dutt, but in year two he was able to win the 2. Bundesliga title and Freiburg was back in the Bundesliga after four years.

The first season in Bundesliga with SC Freiburg saw Dutt escaping relegation. They finished four points ahead of the relegation playoff spot. The 2010–11 season proved to be Dutt's last season at SC Freiburg, the club managed to cling onto the respectable ninth position in the league table.

Bayer Leverkusen

The decision to take Dutt to succeed Bayern Munich bound Jupp Heynckes as coach of Bayer 04 Leverkusen was made in March 2011. "I didn’t come to Leverkusen to turn a second-placed team into a fourth- or fifth-placed team. We came second (last season) and I want to improve on that," said Dutt when he took the reins on 19 June 2011. Dutt was dismissed from his post on 1 April 2012, after a poor run that included a 7–1 away defeat at Barcelona in the round of 16 2011–12 UEFA Champions League, In which Leo Messi became the first player to score 5 goal in a Champions League match, and a streak of four consecutive Bundesliga defeats which left Leverkusen in sixth position in the Bundesliga.

DFB and Werder Bremen
In August 2012, Dutt replaced Matthias Sammer as sporting director of the German football federation (DFB).

Dutt became the new head coach of Werder Bremen on 27 May 2013. Werder Bremen sacked Dutt on 25 October 2014.

Board representative for sport of VfB Stuttgart
On 6 January 2015 Dutt became board representative for sport of VfB Stuttgart.
In May 2016, he was sacked by VfB Stuttgart following the team's relegation from the Bundesliga for the first time in 40 years.

VfL Bochum
On 11 February 2018 Dutt was appointed as manager of VfL Bochum. He was sacked on 26 August 2019.

Wolfsberger AC 
In April 2021 Wolfsberger AC announced, that Robin Dutt is going to be their coach from August 2021.

Managerial statistics

References

External links

Dutt's profile at kicker.de 

1965 births
Living people
Footballers from Cologne
German footballers
Stuttgarter Kickers managers
SC Freiburg managers
Bayer 04 Leverkusen managers
SV Werder Bremen managers
German football managers
Bundesliga managers
2. Bundesliga managers
German people of Indian descent
German people of Bengali descent
VfL Bochum managers
Association football forwards
Wolfsberger AC managers
German expatriate football managers
Expatriate football managers in Austria
Austrian Football Bundesliga managers